Cooch Behar Stadium is a multi-purpose stadium in Cooch Behar, Bengal. The ground is mainly used for organizing matches of football, cricket and other sports. The ground doesn't have any floodlights so the stadium can not host day-night matches. It was made considering all norms of BCCI so that Ranji Trophy matches can be played. The stadium was established in 2008 when they hosted a match of Vijay Merchant Trophy between Gujarat Under-19s and Jharkhand Under-19s.

References

External links 
 cricketarchive
 Wikimapia

Cricket grounds in West Bengal
Sports venues in West Bengal
Buildings and structures in Cooch Behar district
Sports venues completed in 2008
2008 establishments in West Bengal
Cooch Behar